Statistics accurate as of August 15, 2022

See also
List of National Basketball Association career turnovers leaders

External links
WNBA Single Season Leaders and Records for Turnovers

Lists of Women's National Basketball Association players
Women's National Basketball Association statistics